Pont-Viau, Quebec is a district in the southern part of Laval, Quebec, Canada. It was a town before August 6, 1965. It was named after Viau Bridge, which links it to Ahuntsic-Cartierville in Montreal, Quebec.

Geography 
It is deliminated by the Rivière des Prairies to the south, by Duvernay to the east, by Vimont to the north and by Laval-des-Rapides to the west.

Education
Commission scolaire de Laval operates French-language public schools.
 École primaire Saint-Gilles
 École primaire Saint-Julien

Sir Wilfrid Laurier School Board operates English-language public schools. All sections of Laval are zoned to Laval Junior Academy and Laval Senior Academy

References

External links
 City of Laval, official website

Neighbourhoods in Laval, Quebec
Former municipalities in Quebec
Populated places disestablished in 1965
Canada geography articles needing translation from French Wikipedia